Platygaster munita is a species of parasitoid wasp in the family Platygastridae. It is found in Europe.

References

Further reading

 

Parasitic wasps
Articles created by Qbugbot
Insects described in 1836
Platygastridae